This list contains some of the defunct Municipalities of Sweden. The total number of municipalities has been reduced from 2,500 in 1863 to 290 today.



1880–1974
These municipalities were merged into others in between the two major municipality reforms in 1952 and 1974.

Almunge, merged into Uppsala Municipality 1971
Asarum merged into Karlshamn Municipality 1967
Blidö, merged into Norrtälje Municipality 1971
Boo, merged into Nacka 1971
Brunskogs Municipality, merged into Arvika Municipality och Kil Municipality 1971
Dalarö, merged into Österhaninge Municipality 1959
Dalby, merged into Lund Municipality, 1974
Djursholm, merged into Danderyd Municipality 1971
Djurö, merged into Värmdö 1974
Eds Municipality, merged into Grums Municipality 1969
Ekshärads Municipality, merged into Hagfors Municipality 1971
Finnskoga-Dalby Municipality, merged into Torsby Municipality 1974
Frykeruds Municipality, merged into Kil Municipality 1971
Fryksände Municipality, merged into Torsby Municipality 1967
Frösåker, merged into Östhammar Municipality 1957
Frötuna, merged into Norrtälje Municipality 1971
Färingsö, merged into Ekerö Municipality 1971
Genarps Municipality
Gillberga Municipality, merged into Säffle Municipality 1971
Glava Municipality, merged into Arvika Municipality 1971
Grava Municipality, merged into Karlstad Municipality 1971
Gräsmarks Municipality, merged into Sunne Municipality 1971
Grödinge, merged into Botkyrka Municipality 1971
Gunnarskogs Municipality, merged into Arvika Municipality 1971
Gustaf Adolfs Municipality, merged into Hagfors Municipality 1974
Gustavsberg, merged into Värmdö Municipality 1974
Holmedals Municipality, merged into Årjängs Municipality 1971
Hällaryd merged into Karlshamn Municipality 1967
Häverö, merged into Norrtälje Municipality 1971
Järna, merged into Södertälje Municipality 1971
Järnskogs Municipality, merged into Eda Municipality 1971
Klintehamns Municipality, merged into Gotland Municipality 1971
Knivsta, merged into Uppsala 1971 (recreated 2003)
Knutby, merged into Uppsala och Norrtälje 1971
Kroppa Municipality, merged into Filipstad Municipality 1971
Kvillinge Municipality, merged into Norrköpings Municipality 1971
Kävlinge köping (1946–1971), changed name to Kävlinge Municipality
Köla Municipality, merged into Eda Municipality 1971
Lysviks Municipality, merged into Sunne Municipality 1971
Mörrum merged into Karlshamn Municipality 1967
Norra Ny Municipality, merged into Torsby Municipality 1974
Norra Råda Municipality, merged into Hagfors Municipality 1974
Nors Municipality, merged into Karlstad Municipality 1971
Nyeds Municipality, merged into Karlstad Municipality 1971
Nätra Municipality, merged into Örnsköldsvik Municipality 1971
Rämmens Municipality, merged into Filipstad Municipality 1971
Silleruds Municipality, merged into Årjäng Municipality 1971
Stavnäs Municipality, merged into Arvika Municipality och Grums Municipality 1969
Stora Kils Municipality, merged into Kils Municipality 1971
Stora Sunne Municipality, merged into Sunne Municipality 1963
Svanskogs Municipality, merged into Säffle Municipality 1971
Södra Sandby Municipality
Torns Municipality (1952–1967)
Töcksmarks Municipality, merged into Årjängs Municipality 1974
Ulleruds Municipality, merged into Forshaga Municipality 1971
Ullvätterns Municipality, merged into Storfors Municipality 1967
Veberöds Municipality
Visnums Municipality, merged into Kristinehamns Municipality 1971
Vitsands Municipality, merged into Torsby Municipality 1967
Värmlandsbergs Municipality, merged into Filipstad Municipality 1971
Värmlandsnäs Municipality, merged into Säffle Municipality 1971
Väse Municipality, merged into Karlstad Municipality and Kristinehamns Municipality 1971
Västerhaninge, merged into Haninge Municipality 1971
Åkerbo Municipality, merged into Linköping Municipality 1971
Älgå Municipality, merged into Arvika Municipality 1971
Österhaninge, merged into Haninge Municipality 1971
Östmarks Municipality, merged into Torsby Municipality 1971
Östra Fågelviks Municipality, merged into Karlstad Municipality 1967

1952
This is a partial list of the municipalities that were merged into others as part of the municipal reform of 1952.

Alsters Municipality, merged into Nyeds Municipality
Bjurtjärns Municipality, merged into Ullvätterns Municipality
Blomskogs Municipality, merged into Holmedal Municipality
Boda Municipality, merged into Brunskog Municipality
Bogens Municipality, merged into Gunnarskog Municipality
Borgviks Municipality, merged into Eds Municipality
Botilsäter Municipality, merged into Värmlandsnäs Municipality
Brattfors Municipality, merged into Värmlandsberg Municipality
Bro Municipality, merged into Värmlandsnä Municipality
Elleholm merged into Mörrum Municipality
Eskilsäters Municipality, merged into Värmlandsnä Municipality
Dalby Municipality, merged into Finnskoga-Dalby Municipality
Färnebo Municipality, merged into Värmlandsberg Municipality
Gåsborns Municipality, merged into Värmlandsberg Municipality
Huggenäs Municipality, merged into Värmlandsnäs Municipality
Hällaryd and Åryd, merged into Hällaryd Municipality
Högerud Municipality, merged into Stavnäs Municipality
Igelösa and Odarslöv Municipality (−1952)
Karlanda Municipality, merged into Holmedals Municipality
Kila Municipality, merged into Gillberga Municipality
Lekvattnets Municipality, merged into Fryksände Municipality
Lungsunds Municipality, merged into Ullvätterns Municipality
Långseruds Municipality, merged into Svanskogs Municipality
Mangskogs Municipality, merged into Brunskogs Municipality
Millesviks Municipality, merged into Värmlandsnäs Municipality
Nedre Ulleruds Municipality, merged into Ulleruds Municipality
Nordmark Municipality, merged into Värmlandsbergs Municipality
Norra Finnskoga Municipality, merged into Finnskoga-Dalby Municipality
Ny Municipality, merged into Älgå Municipality
Nyskoga Municipality, merged into Vitsands Municipality
Ransäters Municipality, merged into Munkfors Municipality
Ringamåla merged into Asarum Municipality
Rudskoga Municipality, merged into Visnums Municipality
Segerstad Municipality, merged into Nors Municipality
Sillbodal Municipality, merged into Årjängs köping
Skillingmark Municipality, merged into Järnskogs Municipality
Sunnemo Municipality, merged into Norra Råda Municipality
Södra Finnskoga Municipality, merged into Finnskoga-Dalby Municipality
Södra Ny Municipality, merged into Värmlandsnäs Municipality
Södra Råda Municipality, merged into Visnums Municipality
Trankils Municipality, merged into Holmedals Municipality
Tveta Municipality, merged into Säffle stad
Varnums Municipality, merged into Kristinehamns stad
Visnums-Kil Municipality, merged into Visnums Municipality
Värmskog Municipality, merged into Stavnäs Municipality
Västra Fågelviks Municipality, merged into Töcksmarks Municipality
Västra Ämterviks Municipality, merged into Stora Sunne Municipality
Älvsbacka Municipality, merged into Nyeds Municipality
Ölme Municipality, merged into Väse Municipality
Ölserud Municipality, merged into Värmlandsnäs Municipality
Östervallskog Municipality, merged into Töcksmarks Municipality
Östra Ämtervik Municipality, merged into Stora Sunne Municipality
Övre Ullerud Municipality, merged into Ulleruds Municipality

Former municipalities of Sweden
Sweden
Municipalities
Municipalities, former